Jaekseol-cha is a traditional black tea produced in Hadong County, South Gyeongsang Province in South Korea.

Gallery

References 

Black tea
Korean tea